" I Need You" is a song by American singer-songwriter Maurice White released in 1985 by Columbia Records. The song reached No. 20 on the Billboard Adult Contemporary chart and No. 30 on the Billboard Hot Black Singles chart.

Overview
"I Need You" was produced by Maurice White and composed by Mary Unobsky, Priscilla Coolidge and William Smith.

The single's B-side was "Believe in Magic". Both "I Need You" and "Believe in Magic" came from Maurice White's 1985 self-titled album.

Critical reception
People proclaimed that "the brisk ballad (I) Need You is terrific too, especially welcome for White’s stirring vocal." Simon Warner of Popmatters noted that the song has "enough lush hooks". Andrew Hamilton of Allmusic also called I Need You "a classy ballad tenderized by White's crafty read."

Personnel
Backing vocals – Julia Tillman, Marva Holcolm, Maxine Willard
Bass – Abraham Laboriel
Drums – John Robinson 
Guitar – Paul Jackson Jr.
Keyboards, Synthesizer – Robbie Buchanan
Percussion – Paulinho Da Costa
Arranged by Robbie Buchanan
Co-producer – Robbie Buchanan
Producer – Maurice White
Producer [Associate] – Brian Fairweather, Martin Page

References

1985 singles
Columbia Records singles